The white-bellied seedeater (Sporophila leucoptera) is a species of bird in the family Thraupidae.
It is found mainly in Bolivia, Paraguay and eastern Brazil, with smaller numbers in Suriname, southeastern Peru and northern Argentina.
Its natural habitats are subtropical or tropical moist shrubland, swamps, and heavily degraded former forest.

References

white-bellied seedeater
Birds of Brazil
Birds of Bolivia
Birds of Paraguay
white-bellied seedeater
Taxa named by Louis Jean Pierre Vieillot
Birds of the Amazon Basin
Taxonomy articles created by Polbot